The Labyrinth Tour: Live from the O2 is a live and first video album by English singer Leona Lewis and was recorded on 18 June 2010 in London, while Lewis performed at her tour The Labyrinth. It was released on 29 November 2010 with a 10 track live CD, and a Blu-ray version was also released. The recording was broadcast on UK television channel Watch on 3 December 2010. It entered the Official UK Music Video Chart at number 4 on 5 December 2010. It has thus far spent 12 weeks in the UK Top 10.

Track listing
The track listing announced on 3 November 2010.
DVD
"Brave"
"Don't Let Me Down"
"Better in Time"
"Whatever It Takes"
"Take a Bow"
"Video Interlude: Ride a White Swan"
"I See You"
"Can't Breathe"
"Forgive Me"
"Happy"
"Could It Be Magic"
"I Got You"
"Cry Me a River"
"The First Time Ever I Saw Your Face"
"Homeless"
"Video Interlude: They Don't Care About Us"
"Outta My Head"
"Sweet Dreams (Are Made of This)"
"Run"
"Bleeding Love"

CD
"Brave"
"Don't Let Me Down"
"Better in Time"
"Whatever It Takes"
"Happy"
"The First Time Ever I Saw Your Face"
"Outta My Head"
"Sweet Dreams (Are Made of This)"
"Run"
"Bleeding Love"
"Cry Me a River" (Japanese bonus track)
"Could It Be Magic" (Japanese bonus track)

Charts

Credits and personnel
Taken and adapted from The Labyrinth Official Tour Programme.

Performers

Lead vocals – Leona Lewis

Support act – Gabriella Cilmi

Management

Management (Modest!) – Nicola Carson, Richard Griffiths, Harry Magee
Director – William Baker
Assistant show director – Emma Bull

Tour manager – Steve Martin
Production – Steve Levit (Production North)
Agent – David Zedeck (CAA)

Music

Musical director – Paul Beard
Guitar – Graham Kearns, Luke Potashnick
Bass – Chris Brown

Drums – Carlos Hurcules
Background vocals – Adetoun Anibi, Zalika King

Choreography

Choreographer – Jermaine Browne
Assistant Choreographer – Rachel Kay

Dance captain – Jerry Reeve
Dancers – Dennish Jauch, Jamie Karitzis, Jay Revell, Manew Sauls-Addison,Kate Collins, Briony Albert

Aerial performers

Aerial artistic director & choreographer – Dreya Webber

Aerialists – Alexandra Apjarova, Shannon Beach, Sal Vallasso, Davide Zongoli

Stage and costumes

Stage set designer – Alan Macdonald
Prop designer – Nicoline Refsing
Lighting Designers – Nick Whitehouse, Baz Halpin
Lighting Director – Graham Feast
Head of security – Paul Higgins
Hair stylist – Ben Cooke
Make up – Jane Bradley
Leona's head stylist – Allison Edmond
Head stylist and costume designer – Stevie Stewart
Stylists' assistant – Kate Jinkerson
Leona's costume maker – Marco Morante
Tour assistant – Alice Martin

References

External links
Official website

Leona Lewis albums
2010 live albums
Syco Music live albums
Live video albums
2010 video albums
Syco Music video albums
Sony Music live albums
Sony Music video albums